Brotherhood Mutual Insurance Company is an American insurance company primarily serving churches and related institutions (such as Christian schools, camps, colleges).  They are the second largest U.S. provider of property and casualty insurance to Christian churches and related ministries.  Their corporate headquarters is in Fort Wayne, Indiana.  They were founded in 1917 by a group of evangelical Mennonites.

Brotherhood Mutual provides insurance to more than 60,000 customers throughout the United States.  Types of insurance provided include property, liability, commercial auto, workers' compensation, and travel.  They also provide payroll services and travel assistance services to churches, Christian schools, camps, colleges, nonprofits, and missions. Brotherhood Mutual is rated A− (Excellent) with a negative outlook by A.M. Best.

Controversy
In 2007, Brotherhood Mutual denied coverage to the West Adrian United Church of Christ in Michigan, citing higher risks due to the church's endorsement of gay marriage

References

Further reading

External links 
 

Financial services companies established in 1917
Insurance companies of the United States
Companies based in Fort Wayne, Indiana
1917 establishments in Indiana
Financial services companies of the United States
American companies established in 1917